The International Association for Assyriology (IAA) is a non-profit, non-political organization founded in July 2003, and seated in Leiden that "the fields of Cuneiform Studies, ancient Near Eastern History and Archaeology on an international basis and to act as a representative body for these fields in relationship to national, international and private institutions, as well as the general public".

According to the Union of International Associations, this organization was founded in "July 2003, London (UK), during International Congress of Assyriology and Near Eastern Archaeology (RAI)" and "registered in accordance with Dutch law."

The IAA makes an annual congress, the Rencontre Assyriologique Internationale that assembles scholars from all the world at centres of Near Eastern research. Associations and societies are affiliated like The American Oriental Society, British Institute for the Study of Iraq, Deutsche Orient-Gesellschaft, The Israel Society for Assyriology and Ancient Near Eastern Studies and La Société pour l’étude du Proche-Orient ancien.

List of presidents 
Cécile Michel
Walther Sallaberger
Jack M. Sasson
Åke W. Sjöberg

Honorary Council 
M. Roaf (2018)
J. Klein (2017)
W. Van Soldt (2017)
I. Winter (2017)
E. Leichty† (2016)
D. Collon (2016)
J. S. Cooper (2016)
H. Hunger (2015)
S. Zawadzki (2015)
D. Owen (2014)
J. Sasson (2014)
B. Kienast† (2013)
C. Wilcke (2012)
J. D. Hawkins (2011)
W. W. Hallo† (2010)
W. G. Lambert† (2009)
K. R. Veenhof (2007)
E. Reiner† (2005)
A. Sjöberg† (2005)
P. Garelli (2004)

References 

Ancient Near East organizations
Archaeology of the Near East
Assyriology
Archaeological organizations